Peter Alan Koch (born January 23, 1962) is an American actor and a former American football player.

Early life, family and education
Peter Koch was born and raised in New Hyde Park, New York on Long Island. He attended New Hyde Park Memorial High School.

He attended college on a full athletic scholarship at University of Maryland, College Park and played on its Terrapins football team under coaches Jerry Claiborne and Bobby Ross. 

Years later, Koch attended free medical studies classes at UCLA in furtherance of his efforts as a personal trainer.

Professional football
Koch was a defensive end who played five seasons in the National Football League, for the Cincinnati Bengals (1984), the Kansas City Chiefs (1985–1987), and the Los Angeles Raiders (1989).

He was selected 16th overall in the 1984 NFL Draft. One round later, the Bengals drafted Koch's Maryland teammate, quarterback Boomer Esiason. Their teammate, Frank Reich, was drafted into the NFL the next season and is currently head coach of the Carolina Panthers.

Other pursuits
Koch became an actor on television and feature films. He also appeared in television commercials, including ones for Ford trucks, Kay Jewelers and KTM motorcycles. He received his SAG card in 1985. He also became a certified personal trainer, attending free medical studies classes at UCLA.

Selected filmography
Film
 1986 Heartbreak Ridge as Private "Swede" Johanson
 1986 Heat as Tiel
 1988 Johnny Be Good as Pete Andropolous 
 1989 Loverboy as Claude Delancy
 1991 Legal Tender as Rudy Dushak
 1993 Sunset Grill as Christian
 1997 Conspiracy Theory as Fire Captain
Television
 1992 Silk Stalkings as J.T. "The Hangman" Martin (episode "Blo-Dri")
 1992 Renegade as Boone Avery (episode "Hunting Accident")
 1994 Island City as Lieutenant Michael Mendi
 1999 Nash Bridges as Bart Mackie (episode "Pump Action")
 1999 Sliders as Ike (episode "The Unstuck Man")
 2009 FlashForward as Paramedic #2 (episode "No More Good Days")
 2014 Enlisted as The Swede (episode "Vets")

References

External links
"Pete Koch Past Stats, Statistics, History, and Awards" at databasefootball.com

1962 births
Living people
People from New Hyde Park, New York
Players of American football from New York (state)
American football defensive tackles
Maryland Terrapins football players
Cincinnati Bengals players
Kansas City Chiefs players
Los Angeles Raiders players
American male film actors
American male television actors